Porridge is a British television sitcom, starring Kevin Bishop, written by Dick Clement and Ian La Frenais, and broadcast on BBC One. The show is a sequel to the original 1974 series of the same name, which both Clement and La Frenais wrote. The sitcom focuses on prison inmate, Nigel Norman Fletcher (played by Bishop), the grandson of Norman Stanley Fletcher, who is sent to Wakeley Prison to serve a five year sentence for cyber crimes.

The programme's creation came about when the BBC decided to air a one-off special of Porridge as part of its Landmark Sitcom Season in 2016, which later proved popular with viewers and led to a series being commissioned, with Clement and La Frenais recruited into the show's production team. The first episode premiered on 6 October 2017.

Premise
The main storylines of the show focus on its central character, Nigel Norman Fletcher, a talented computer specialist, who is sent to the fictional Wakeley Prison in Hampshire to serve a five year prison sentence for cyber crimes, the proceeds of which he used to support his now ex-girlfriend's lifestyle. Much like his grandfather, Norman Stanley Fletcher, Nigel has his own personal opinions of criminal life that he likes to voice out, though he considers himself to be an "uncommon criminal", as he has some regret of the actions he committed, and often seeks to avoid being caught up in illegal schemes that could endanger his well-being or add time to his sentence. Each episode's plot usually focuses on events that Fletcher becomes involved in.

In addition to Fletcher, the series also features an array of supporting characters. Like his grandfather, Fletcher shares a cell with another prisoner, named Joe Lotterby, a senior but veteran old-time criminal who knew his grandfather and his old cell-mate Lennie Godber, and has a somewhat cynical view on life as a result of his previous sentences in prison, while he often comes into conflict with prison officer Mr Meekie, whose character is similar to that of Mr Mackay from the original series, in that he firmly dislikes Fletcher and often suspects him of being up to something, and who often mocks him in return as a result. Although Fletcher has a firm dislike of the prison guards, he has some respect for other prison officer Mr Braithwaite, whose character is similar to that of Mr Barrowclough in the original series, in that he is more gentle and trusting of the prisoners and thus quite gullible, although he is quite meek when fights break out and slightly dim on some areas, such as jokes. Fletcher is close friends with two other prisoners, Shel and Aziz, and often has dealings with Dougie Parfitt, a hardcore criminal involved in contraband and drugs, who sometimes requests Fletcher's help with a scheme he is working on, and is often assisted by his right-hand man Scudds (referred to as "Scuddsy" by Fletcher), who is somewhat dim-witted, but has feelings and a deep respect for Fletcher.

Cast
 Kevin Bishop as Nigel Norman Fletcher
 Dave Hill as Joe Lotterby
 Mark Bonnar as Mr Meekie
 Dominic Coleman as Mr Braithwaite
 Harry Peacock as Dougie Parfitt
 Ricky Grover as Scudds
 Jason Barnett as Shel
 Harman Singh as Aziz
 Colin Hoult as Barry
 Daniel Fearn as Ullett
 Rory Gallagher as Loomis
 Pippa Haywood as Governor Littlewood
 Zahra Ahmadi as Dr. Marsden
 Caolan Byrne as Culhane

For the one-off special, Colin McFarlane portrayed the character of The Judge, who sentences Fletcher for his crimes. Much like in the original series, the narration given in the opening titles, is voiced by McFarlane.

Joe Lotterby tells Fletcher that he served time at Slade Prison during the 1970s alongside Norman Stanley Fletcher. In the 1979 film version of the original series, a character named Lotterby, played by Zoot Money, works in the kitchens at Slade alongside Godber. Both characters are named for Sydney Lotterby, the producer of the original series.

Production
In March 2016, it was announced that a sequel pilot to Porridge would air as part of the BBC's Landmark Sitcom Season, starring Kevin Bishop as Norman Stanley Fletcher's grandson and written by the original writers Dick Clement and Ian La Frenais.

After the success of the pilot, in October 2016, BBC One commissioned the show for a full series which went into production in January 2017. However there are no plans for a second run due to poor ratings.

Episodes

Seven episodes of Porridge, all written by Dick Clement and Ian La Frenais, were produced for the BBC. The show began airing on 28 August 2016 and ended on 10 November 2017. All episodes had a running time of 30 minutes.

References

External links

2016 British television series debuts
2017 British television series endings
2010s British crime comedy television series
2010s British prison television series
2010s British sitcoms
BBC high definition shows
BBC prison television shows
BBC television sitcoms
English-language television shows
Sequel television series
Television series by BBC Studios